The Nevado del Tolima is a Late Pleistocene to recently active andesitic stratovolcano located in the Tolima department, Colombia. The volcano lies south of Nevado del Ruiz volcano and is situated within the Los Nevados National Natural Park. The volcano, whose most recent activity dates to 1943 and last major eruption around 3600 years ago, overlies the Eocene El Bosque Batholith, dated at 49.1 ± 1.7 Ma.

Geography and geology 
The steep-sided, glacier-clad Nevado del Tolima volcano contrasts with the broad profile of Nevado del Ruiz to the north. The summit consists of a cluster of Late Pleistocene to Holocene lava domes that were associated with thick block-lava flows on the northern and eastern flanks, and extensive pyroclastic-flow deposits. Holocene activity has included explosive eruptions ranging in size from moderate to plinian. The last major eruption took place about 3600 years ago. Lava dome growth has produced block and ash flows that traveled primarily to the northeast and southeast.

Hydrology 
The snow-capped Nevado del Tolima, with its almost symmetrical structure, has a radial drainage pattern in the upper part. The residual glacier on the top of the mountain feeds the rivers Totare, San Romualdo, Toche and Combeima. The latter is the main water source of the municipality of Ibagué. All these currents drain into the eastern slope of the Cordillera Central, directly into the Magdalena River.

Flora and fauna

Los Nevados National Park 
The Nevado del Tolima is located within the Los Nevados National Natural Park, In addition to the Nevado del Tolima, seven other volcanoes are located in the park: Nevado del Ruiz, Santa Isabel, Nevado del Quindío, Paramillo de Santa Rosa, Cerro Bravo, Cerro Machín and Nevado El Cisne.

The park spans  and stretches across the departments of Caldas, Quindío, Risaralda, Tolima. The park is administratively part of the municipalities Villamaría, Santa Rosa de Cabal, Pereira, Salento, and Ibagué.

Eruptive history 
Holocene activity has included explosive eruptions ranging in size from moderate to plinian. The last major eruption took place about 3600 years ago. Lava dome growth has produced block and ash flows that traveled primarily to the NE and SE. Minor explosive eruptions have been recorded from Tolima in the 19th and 20th centuries.

See also 
 List of volcanoes in Colombia
 List of volcanoes by elevation

References

Bibliography

External links 
 Nevado del Tolima on summitpost 
 Mountaineering and photography blog including different ascent routes

Mountains of Colombia
Glaciers of Colombia
Stratovolcanoes of Colombia
Active volcanoes
Andean Volcanic Belt
Pleistocene stratovolcanoes
Pleistocene Colombia
Late Pleistocene
Geography of Tolima Department
Five-thousanders of the Andes